Rovinaglia is a frazione in the comune of Borgo Val di Taro in the province of Parma, Italy.

References

Province of Parma